Yamdi Khola(Nepali : यामदी खोला) is a tributary of Seti Gandaki River in Pokhara.

References 
Rivers of Gandaki Province
Geography of Pokhara